Eleanor Ruggles (1916-2008) was an American biographer and book reviewer.  The 1955 film Prince of Players, starring Richard Burton as the 19th century American actor Edwin Booth was based on her book. She also wrote for Encyclopædia Britannica, including the page for Edwin Booth.

Early life
Eleanor Ruggles was the daughter of Daniel Blaisdell Ruggles, a judge on the Nantucket circuit, and Alice (Morrill) Ruggles She grew up in Jamaica Plain and then  Beacon Hill, and was educated at Winsor School, Boston. She earned a bachelor's degree in English and theater arts from Vassar College, graduating in 1938.

Personal life
She married Robert Semmes O'Leary of New Orleans, a Harvard University faculty assistant, who was later an editor of the New England Medical Journal.

Publications
Gerard Manley Hopkins-A Life (1945)
Prince of Players: Edwin Booth (1953)

References

1916 births
2008 deaths
Winsor School alumni
Vassar College alumni
American biographers
20th-century American women writers
American women biographers
21st-century American women